Turbonilla kamayura is a species of sea snail, a marine gastropod mollusk in the family Pyramidellidae, the pyrams and their allies.

Description
The shell grows to a length of 4 mm.

Distribution
This species occurs in the Atlantic Ocean off Brazil.

References

External links
 To Encyclopedia of Life
 To World Register of Marine Species

kamayura
Gastropods described in 2003